The G32 BMW 6 Series is the fourth generation of the BMW Gran Turismo range of 5-door liftback executive cars launched in 2017 as the successor to the BMW 5 Series Gran Turismo. The 6 Series nameplate had previously been used on the F06/F12/F13 grand tourers produced from 2011-18 but this would be succeeded by the 8 Series (G15)

A facelifted version was unveiled alongside the new 5 Series on 27 May 2020. For 2021, a mild hybrid powertrain was introduced.

Development and launch 

Details of the 6 Series Gran Turismo were released online on June 14, 2017. The car was later officially unveiled at the 2017 Frankfurt International Auto Show in September. The exterior was designed by Hussein Al-Attar.

Compared to the 5 Series Gran Turismo, the body of the 6 Series is  longer,  lower, and  lighter. The 6 Series Gran Turismo is based on the modular Cluster Architecture (CLAR) platform and comes with self-levelling air suspension as a standard feature.

Initial models include two petrol engines, the 630i and 640i as well as the 630d which is one of the two diesel engines. The 640d is the second diesel model, which was released later in September 2017. The newest and smallest engine for the 6 Series GT is the 620d. This engine is available since July 2018 and will be the entry-level version for this lineup. All models are available as an all-wheel drive (xDrive) version. The 640d model is available only with all-wheel drive. The only 6 Series GT to be sold in the USA was the 640i xDrive, for the 2019 model year, as the previous 6 Series (the F06-based Gran Coupe) was offered in the 2018 model year.

Equipment 
The 6 Series Gran Turismo comes with a 10.25-inch screen featuring the latest version of iDrive 6.0, and is available with gesture control. BMW Active Driving Assistant is a standard feature on all models, and includes safety features such as: blind spot monitoring, lane departure warning and speed limit information.
The 6 Series GT also features adaptive headlights, and many sensors to assist parking and motorway driving.

Transmissions 
All models feature an 8-speed automatic transmission. The available transmissions are:
 8-speed ZF 8HP50Z automatic (630i / 640i / 640i xDrive)
 8-speed ZF 8HP75Z automatic (630d)
 8-speed ZF 8HP75X automatic (630d xDrive / 640d xDrive)
Also features manual sequential mode as well as sport shifting which holds the gears longer and spins the turbochargers.

Models

Petrol engines

Diesel engines

Safety 
The 2017 630d GT received five stars overall in its Euro NCAP test.

Awards 

 2017 EuroCar Body Award

References

External links 
 

Cars introduced in 2017
6 Series (G32)
G32
Sedans
Mid-size cars
Executive cars
Euro NCAP executive cars